Li Duihong (Chinese: 李对红; born January 25, 1970) is a female Chinese sports shooter. She won the 1996 Atlanta Olympic Games in the 25m sport pistol. Li was born in Daqing, Heilongjiang. She has a twin sister named Li Shuanghong.

Olympic results

Other major performances
 1982 Hawana World Cup – 1st small-bore sporting pistol
 1993 Oslo CISM World Shooting Championships – 1st sporting pistol individual (CISM record), 2nd sporting pistol team, 2nd military pistol rapid-fire individual & team
 1994 World Championships – 1st 10 air pistol team & 25m sporting pistol team, 3rd 25m sporting pistol individual, 4th 10m air pistol 40 shots individual
 1995 Rome World Games for Armymen – 1st central-fire pistol team & 25m pistol rapid-fire team
 2001 CISM World Shooting Championships – 1st sporting pistol individual & team
 2002 World Championships – 1st 25m sporting pistol team

Records

References
  – China Daily
 

1970 births
Living people
Chinese female sport shooters
ISSF pistol shooters
Olympic shooters of China
Shooters at the 1992 Summer Olympics
Shooters at the 1996 Summer Olympics
Olympic gold medalists for China
Olympic silver medalists for China
Olympic medalists in shooting
Asian Games medalists in shooting
Sport shooters from Heilongjiang
People from Daqing
Shooters at the 1990 Asian Games
Shooters at the 1994 Asian Games
Shooters at the 1998 Asian Games
Shooters at the 2002 Asian Games
Twin sportspeople
Chinese twins
Medalists at the 1996 Summer Olympics
Medalists at the 1992 Summer Olympics
Asian Games gold medalists for China
Asian Games silver medalists for China
Asian Games bronze medalists for China
Medalists at the 1990 Asian Games
Medalists at the 1994 Asian Games
Medalists at the 1998 Asian Games
Medalists at the 2002 Asian Games
20th-century Chinese women